The Japan Women's Sevens is an annual women's rugby sevens tournament, currently hosted in Kitakyushu as one of the stops on the World Rugby Women's Sevens Series. Japan joined for the fifth edition of the series. The tournament is played at the Mikuni World Stadium.

Champions

Key:Blue border on the left indicates tournaments included in the World Rugby Women's Sevens Series.

See also
 Japan Sevens (men's tournament)

References

 
World Rugby Women's Sevens Series tournaments
Sevens
International rugby union competitions hosted by Japan
Women's rugby union competitions in Asia
Women's rugby union competitions for national teams
Rugby sevens competitions in Asia
Recurring sporting events established in 2015